The 1913 Brown Bears football team represented Brown University as an independent during the 1913 college football season. Led by 12th-year head coach Edward N. Robinson, Brown compiled a record of 4–5.

Schedule

References

Brown
Brown Bears football seasons
Brown Bears football